The Shrine of Abu Lu'lu'a is a mausoleum built over what is popularly believed to be the final resting place of Abu Lu'lu'a Firuz, a Persian slave who assassinated the second Islamic caliph Umar ibn al-Khattab in 644 CE. The structure was built by the Ilkhanid Mongols, and is located in Kashan, Isfahan Province, Iran.

The historical Abu Lu'lu'a died in Medina (the capital of the early caliphate, situated in the Arabian Peninsula) shortly after his assassination of Umar in 644 CE. However, in later times legends arose according to which Abu Lu'lu'a was saved from his pursuers by Ali ibn Abi Talib (the cousin and son-in-law of the prophet Muhammad, who is also revered by Shi'ite Muslims as the first Imam). As these stories would have it, Ali instantaneously transported Abu Lu'lu'a by means of a special prayer to Kashan, where he married and lived out the rest of his life.

During the 16th-century Safavid conversion of Iran to Shia Islam, a festival started to be celebrated in honor of Abu Lu'lu'a, commemorating his assassination of Umar ibn al-Khattab. Named , it was originally held around Abu Lu'lu'a's sanctuary in Kashan, each year at the anniversary of Umar's death ( of the Islamic year). However, later it also started to be celebrated elsewhere in Iran, sometimes on 9 Rabi' al-Awwal rather than on 26 Dhu al-Hijja. The festival celebrated Abu Lu'lu'a, nicknamed for the occasion , as a national hero who had defended the religion by killing the oppressive caliph.

Due to political sensitivities, from the Qajar period (1789–1925) onward the festival gradually stopped being celebrated in the major cities of Iran, until it was eventually banned officially by the Islamic Republic of Iran in 1979. Nevertheless, the festival itself is still celebrated in Iran, though often secretly and indoors rather than outdoors. It is now held on the 9th day of the month of Rabi' Al-Awwal of the Islamic year, lasting until the 27th of the same month.

In recent years, controversy was caused when al-Azhar University demanded the Iranian government to demolish Abu Lu'lu'a's shrine. The issue caused the cancellation of diplomatic relations between the university and the Iranian government. These requests were made because the shrine was considered to be "offensive and un-Islamic" by mainstream Sunni scholars. Due to this Sunni pressure, which also included an intervention by the International Union for Muslim Scholars, the Iranian government shut down the shrine in 2007.

See also

Omar Koshan, the annual festival which was originally held in honor of Abu Lu'lu'a

References

Sources cited

Mausoleums in Iran
National works of Iran
Buildings and structures in Kashan